The Nismo Global Driver Exchange (also known as the Nismo Global Athlete Program) is an initiative from Nissan and Nismo to share driving experience from various motor racing categories around the world.

The program was launched in February 2013 and currently consists of drivers racing in the All-Japan Formula Three Championship, Blancpain Endurance Series, FIA World Endurance Championship, GP3 Series, Super GT and V8 Supercars. Drivers from the program have also raced Nissan cars in various endurance races, including the 24 Hours of Le Mans, Dubai 24 Hour, 24 Hours Nürburgring, Spa 24 Hours, Bathurst 12 Hour and the Sepang 12 Hours. Examples of driver exchanges include Michael Krumm and Lucas Ordóñez testing a V8 Supercar in 2013 and James Moffat racing in the 2014 Dubai 24 Hour.

In February 2015, Katsumasa Chiyo, Wolfgang Reip and Florian Strauss drove their Nissan GT-R Nismo GT3 to victory in the 2015 Liqui Moly Bathurst 12 Hour, after Chiyo took the lead with four minutes remaining. Chiyo and Reip also won the 2015 Blancpain Endurance Series along with Alex Buncombe.

Current drivers

External links
 Official Nismo website
 Gran Turismo Academy
 Nissan Motorsport (V8 Supercars)
 RJN Motorsport (Blancpain Endurance Series)

References

Nissan in motorsport